The Crocodile River, also referred to as Crocodile River (East), is a large river traversing Mpumalanga province of South Africa. It is a tributary of the Komati River.

Course
It originates north of Dullstroom, Mpumalanga, in the Steenkampsberg Mountains. Downstream of Kwena Dam, the Crocodile River winds through the Schoemanskloof and down the Montrose Falls. It then flows eastwards past Nelspruit and joins the Komati River at Komatipoort.

The Crocodile River in Mpumalanga has a catchment area of 10,446 km2. Upstream it is a popular trout fishing place. It flows through the Nelspruit industrial area, the Lowveld agricultural area and borders the Kruger National Park. The decrease in flow of the river is due to water abstractions for irrigated fruit and sugar cane farming.

Tributaries
The Elands River and Nels River are the tributaries to the Crocodile. Elands River famous for its waterfalls, rises on the grassland plateau of the Drakensberg mountains near the town of Machadodorp while the Nels River rises on the Drakensberg as well .

See also 
 List of rivers of South Africa
 List of reservoirs and dams in South Africa

References

Rivers of Mpumalanga